Steak au poivre or pepper steak is a French dish that consists of a steak, traditionally a filet mignon, coated with coarsely cracked peppercorns.  The peppercorns form a crust on the steak when cooked and provide a pungent counterpoint to the beef. Steak au poivre may be found in traditional French restaurants in most urban areas.

Preparation
The peppercorn crust is made by placing the steak in a bed of cracked black (or mixed) peppercorns. Typically, the steak is seared in a hot skillet with a small amount of butter and oil. The steak is seared at a high temperature to cook the outside quickly and form the crust while leaving the interior rare to medium rare. The steak is left to rest for several minutes before serving.

Steak au poivre is often served with pan peppercorn sauce consisting of reduced cognac, heavy cream, and the fond from the bottom of the pan, often including other ingredients such as butter, shallots, and/or Dijon mustard. Common side dishes to steak au poivre are various forms of mashed potatoes and pommes frites (small fried shoestring potatoes).

See also
 List of steak dishes

References

Beef dishes
French cuisine